Beginning in the second half of the 16th century, the Kingdom of Spain established a number of missions throughout La Florida in order to convert the Native Americans to Christianity, to facilitate control of the area, and to prevent its colonization by other countries, in particular, England and France. Spanish Florida originally included much of what is now the Southeastern United States, although Spain never exercised long-term effective control over more than the northern part of what is now the State of Florida from present-day St. Augustine to the area around Tallahassee, southeastern Georgia, and some coastal settlements, such as Pensacola, Florida. A few short-lived missions were established in other locations, including Mission Santa Elena in present-day South Carolina, around the Florida peninsula, and in the interior of Georgia and Alabama.

The missions of what are now northern Florida and southeastern Georgia were divided into main four provinces where the bulk of missionary effort took place. These were Apalachee, comprising the eastern part of what is now the Florida Panhandle; Timucua, ranging from the St. Johns River west to the Suwanee; Mocama, the coastal areas east of the St. Johns running north to the Altamaha River; and Guale, north of the Altamaha River along the coast to the present-day Georgia Sea Islands. These provinces roughly corresponded to the areas where those dialects were spoken among the varying Native American peoples, thus, they reflected the territories of the peoples. Missionary provinces were relatively fluid and evolved over the years according to demographic and political trends, and at various times smaller provinces were established, abandoned, or merged with larger ones. There were also ephemeral attempts to establish missions elsewhere, particularly further south into Florida.

History
The priests and religious that traveled with the early conquistadors notwithstanding, the 1549 expedition of Father Luis de Cancer and three other Dominicans to Tampa Bay was the first solely missionary effort attempted in La Florida. It ended in failure after six weeks with de Cancer's death at the hands of the Tocobaga natives, which sent shock waves through the Dominican missionary community in New Spain for many years.

The first Spanish missions to Florida, starting with the foundation of St. Augustine in 1565, were attached to presidios. Between 1559 and 1567, ten presidios were established at major harbors from Port Royal Sound in modern South Carolina to Pensacola Bay on the northern Gulf of Mexico in an attempt to prevent other European powers from establishing bases on land claimed by Spain. Most of the presidios were unsustainable; San Mateo (near modern Jacksonville, Florida) was destroyed by the French, the entire garrison at Tocobago was wiped out, and most of the other presidios were abandoned due to a combination of hostility from the native inhabitants, difficulty in providing supplies, and damage from hurricanes. By 1573, the only remaining presidios in Florida were at St. Augustine and Santa Elena on Paris Island, South Carolina. Santa Elena was abandoned in 1587, leaving St. Augustine as the only sizeable Spanish settlement in La Florida.

The missions at the presidios were staffed by the Jesuits. Due to the hostility of the Native Americans, which resulted in the killing of several of the missionaries, the Jesuits withdrew from the mission field in La Florida in 1572. Franciscan friars entered into La Florida in 1573, but at first confined their activities to the immediate vicinity of St. Augustine. The Franciscans began taking their mission to the Guale and Timucua along the Atlantic coast in 1587. Starting in 1606 the Franciscans expanded their mission efforts westward across northern Florida along a primitive but lengthy road known as El Camino Real. The road and the network of missions stretched across the Florida panhandle through the territory of the Timucua and reached the Apalachees in the vicinity of modern Tallahassee by 1633.

The mission system functioned for decades, as the Spanish convinced most village leaders to provide food and labor in exchange for tools and protection. Regular waves of European-borne disease along with conflict with Carolina colonists to the north weakened the system as the 1600s progressed. It collapsed in the aftermath of Queen Anne's War, when colonists from the Province of Carolina, along with their Creek allies, killed or kidnapped much of the remaining native population of Spanish Florida except in areas near St. Augustine and Pensacola. The network of missions was virtually destroyed by Carolina Governor James Moore's incursions into northern Florida between 1702 and 1709, a series of attacks that were later called the Apalachee massacre. Dozens of missions and surrounding villages were abandoned by the early 1700s and their locations lost, as was much of the former route of El Camino Real. As a result, only a few mission sites in Florida have been found and positively identified.

Architecture
The mission buildings of La Florida were built with posts set into the ground. The walls were palmetto thatch, wattle and daub or plank, or left open. The floors were clay, and scholars believe the roofs were thatched. The church buildings in the missions averaged some 20 m by 11 m. Other buildings situated within a palisade included a convento to house the missionaries, a barracks for the soldiers, and often a separate kitchen.

Provinces
The Spanish used the term "province" for the territory of a tribe or chiefdom. There was no fixed definition of province boundaries. As tribes and chiefdoms lost population and importance, the provinces associated with them would no longer appear in the records. Other provinces expanded to take in their territories. Most of the people taken into the mission system were Timucua speakers. Three major groups that spoke other languages were also taken into the mission system. The Guale Province was the territory the Guale, and covered what is now coastal Georgia and the Sea Islands north of the Altamaha River. The Guale were among the first people to be taken into the mission system, in the 1580s.

Later in the 17th century, Guale Province was sometimes referred to as extending southward and including the region otherwise known as Mocama. The Apalachee Province included the Apalachee people, who spoke a Muskogean language, and were brought into the mission system in the 1630s. It occupied the easternmost part of what is now the Florida Panhandle, along the Gulf of Mexico coast from the Aucilla River to the Ochlockonee River. The Spanish established one early mission among the Mayaca people, a non-Timucuan speaking tribe south of the Agua Fresca, and resumed efforts among them, and their relatives, the Jororo, in the late 17th century. This district, which became known as the Mayaca-Jororo Province, occupied an area to the south of Lake George, on the upper (southern) St. Johns River.

The Timucua-speakers, most of whom were brought into the mission system in the late 16th and early 17th centuries, were initially seen by the Spanish as living in a dozen or so provinces, with the Acuera, Ibi, Mocama, Potano, Timucua (in its restricted sense, north of the Santa Fe River, and east of the Suwannee River), Utina, Yufera, and Yustaga provinces becoming major components of the mission system. During the 17th century, as Timucuan populations declined and the locations of Spanish missions were consolidated along the road between St. Augustine and Apalachee, most of these provinces were gradually consolidated in Spanish usage into a Timucua Province stretching from the Atlantic Ocean to the Aucilla River.

The Mocama Province included the coastal areas of southeastern Georgia and northern Florida from St. Simons Island south to St. Augustine, extending westward to approximately the distance of the St. Johns River in Florida. It included some of the earliest missions to be established, and served the Mocama, a Timucuan-speaking group of the coastal areas. Important missions established in the Mocama Province were San Juan del Puerto, among the Saturiwa chiefdom, and San Pedro de Mocama, among the Tacatacuru.

The Timucua Province was initially established to serve the people known to the Spanish as the Timucua (called the Northern Utina by modern scholars), who spoke the "Timucua proper" dialect. Eventually, however, it absorbed several other Timucua-speaking provinces and became the largest of all the Florida mission districts. Following shortly after the success of the Mocama missions, the Spanish established missions among the Agua Fresca (Eastern Utina or Freshwater Timucua) along the middle St. Johns River, from roughly present-day Palatka south to Lake George. Similarly, the missions among the Potano, centered on what is now Gainesville, were considered part of the Potano Province, while missions to the Acuera, who lived around the Ocklawaha River, were part of the Acuera Province. Most of these areas were eventually considered part of the larger Timucua Province, in some cases because native populations had declined to the point that they could no longer support multiple missions. (The missions in Acuera Province were abandoned after the Timucua rebellion of 1656, although non-Christian Acueras continued to live there for another 40 years.) At this stage the Timucua Province included the area between the St. Johns and Suwanee rivers. Later, the Yustaga Province, which served the Yustaga who lived to the west of the Suwanee as far as the Aucilla River, was added, and the Timucua province covered the majority of north central Florida. The coastal area south of the Mocama Province and St. Augustine was known as La Costa; though this area had some Timucua speakers, it did not see much missionary activity, perhaps because it was less densely populated. There were also a few missions established to the north and west of the Apalachee Province.

Missions
Apalo
Santa Ana de Potano
San Antón de Carlos (Calusa)
San Antonio de Anacape/Enacape (Agua Dulce/Utina)
San Antonio de Bacuqua (Apalachee)
Assumpción del Puerto (Amacano, Chine, and Pacara)
San Augustín de Ahoica
San Augustín de Urihica
San Blás de Avino (Acuera)
San Buenaventura de Guadalquini (moved to St. Johns River as Santa Cruz y San Buenaventura de Guadalquini)
San Buenaventura de Potano
San Carlos de los Chacatos
San Carlos de Yatcatani
Santa Catalina de Afuerica (Northern Utina)
Santa Catalina de Guale (St. Catherines Island, Sapelo Island and Amelia Island, in succession)
Santa Clara de Tupiqui (Sapelo River)
Cofa (mouth of Suwannee River)
La Concepción de Ayubale (Ayubale)
Santa Cruz de Ajohica
Santa Cruz de Cachipile (Arapaha)
Santa Cruz de Capoli
Santa Cruz de Tarihica (Northern Utina)
San Damián de Cupaica (... de Cupahica) (... de Escambi)
San Diego de Helaca/Laca, later moved to San Diego de Salamototo (on St. Johns River)
San Diego de Satuache (Guale)
Santo Domingo de Asao (Guale)
Santo Domingo de Talaje (Altamaha River)
Santa Elena
Santa Elena de Machaba (Yustaga)
La Encarnación a la Santa Cruz de Sábacola (Chatot)
Santa Fe de Toloca/Teleco/Toloco
San Felipe de Athulutheca
San Francisco de Chuaquin (Arapaha)
San Francisco de Oconi
San Francisco de Potano (Potano)
San Ildefonso de Chamini/Chamile (Arapaha)
Santa Isabel de Utinahica
San Joseph de Escambe (San José de Escambe) (Apalachee)
San Joseph de Ocuya (San José de Ocuya)
San Joseph de Sapala (San José de Zapala) (Sapelo Island)
San Juan de Aspalaga
San Juan (de) Guacara (on the Suwannee River)
San Juan del Puerto
San Lorenzo de Ibihica
San Lorenzo de Ivitachuco (Apalachee)
Santa Lucia de Acuera
San Luis de Apalachee (Tallahassee), a U.S. National Historic Landmark
San Luis de Eloquale (Acuera)
San Luis de Talimali (Apalachee)
Santa María
Santa María de Ayubale (Apalachee)
Santa María de Loreto (Tequesta)
Santa María de los Angeles de Arapaha
Santa Maria de Sena, on Amelia Island
San Martín de Asunción de Puerto (Chatot)
San Martín de Timucua/Ayacutu/Ayaocuto
San Martín de Tomole (Apalachee)
San Matheo de Tolapatafi (Yustaga)
San Miguel de Asile (Yustaga)
San Miguel de Potano
San Nicolás de Tolentino (Chatot)
Nombre de Dios
Nuestra Señora de Guadalupe de Tolomato
San Pedro de Mocama (Cumberland Island)
San Pedro do los Chines
San Pedro y San Pablo de Patale (San Pedro de Patali)
San Pedro y San Pablo de Potohiriba (San Pedro de Potohiriba) (Yustaga)
La Purificación de Tama
San Salvador de Mayaca
Santiago de Oconi (near the Okefenokee Swamp)
San Sebastian

See also
Spanish missions in Georgia
History of Florida
Spanish Florida (La Florida)

Notes

References

Hann, John H. (1996). "The Missions of Spanish Florida". In Gannon, Michael, ed. The New History of Florida. Gainesville, Florida: University Presses of Florida.

External links
The New Georgia Encyclopedia: Spanish Missions 
Spanish Mission Bell at A History of Central Florida Podcast

 
Spanish missions in the United States
Spanish Florida
Spanish colonization of the Americas
History of Catholicism in the United States
Spanish Colonial architecture in the United States